Erik Schouten (born 16 August 1991) is a Dutch professional footballer who plays as a centre-back for Eerste Divisie club Willem II.

Career
On 12 July 2019 it was confirmed, that Schouten had joined SC Cambuur on a two-year contract.

Schouten joined Willem II on 13 June 2022, signing a three-year contract.

References

External links
 Voetbal International profile 
 
 

1991 births
Living people
Dutch footballers
FC Volendam players
SC Cambuur players
Willem II (football club) players
Eredivisie players
Eerste Divisie players
People from Drechterland
Association football defenders
Footballers from North Holland